This was the first edition of the tournament since it was discontinued in 2011.

Geoffrey Blancaneaux and Alexandre Müller won the title after defeating Flavio Cobolli and Matteo Gigante 4–6, 6–3, [11–9] in the final.

Seeds

Draw

References

External links
 Main draw

Sanremo Challenger - Doubles